The Rocca Maggiore is a castle which dominated, for more than eight hundred years, the citadel of Assisi and the valley of Tescio, constituting the most viable fortification for their defense.

Description and history 

Built in 1316, and include two fortresses, Major and Minor.

The first documented regarding the fortress date back to the 1173, when the German diplomat and Catholic Archbishop Christian of Mainz (1130 - 1183, chancellor of Germany during the reign of Emperor Frederick I Barbarossa, occupied Assisi on behalf of the sovereign who stayed there for a short time.

The young future King of Sicily and Emperor Frederick II also lived there, entrusted by his mother Costanza d'Altavilla to the Duchess of Urslingen, wife of Duke of Spoleto and  comes Assisi  Corrado, confidant of the monarch Swabian. Queen Empress Constance returned to Sicily and then return to Assisi with the wife Henry VI: the baptism of Constantine was celebrated in Cathedral of San Rufino and was imposed the auspicious name (of the two grandparents) Frederick Roger.

In 1198 the city passed to the Guelph of Pope Innocent III, and the people, causing extensive damage to the fortress, drove the imperial legate with Frederick, who was only four years. In that year Francis of Assisi was sixteen.

The fortress was reconstructed in 1356, the initiative of Cardinal Albornoz (1310 - 1367), commissioned by Innocent VI by Avignon, to strengthen the fortifications of the Papal.

In 1458, the captain Perugia and Lord of Assisi Jacopo Piccinino (1423 - 1465 built the polygonal tower north -occidentale, then finished by Pope Pius II, and connected to the rest of the walls of a corridor equipped and strengthened.
The complex consists of a fortress walls, built with the pink stone of Mount Subasio, trapezoidal, with towers at each corner, which includes square formwork, renovated in 1478 by Sixtus V, on which stands the keep.

The inside of the fortress (where, in 1972, some scenes of the movie "Brother Sun, Sister Moon", directed by Franco Zeffirelli keep.)leads to the entrance of the round bastion, commissioned in 1535 by Paul III. There is a large fenced yard, where were the rooms of service, and the male, former home of the castle, divided into four rooms accessible by a spiral staircase.

The Rocca Maggiore joins, through the fourteenth century walls, with its fortress Minor, or stronghold or keep of St. Anthony, commissioned by Albornoz in order to consolidate, to the mountain, that part of fortification.

Gallery

Note

Bibliography 
 AA. VV.,  Umbria , the Italian Touring Club, Perugia 2004.
 Daniel Amoni, Castles, Fortresses and Castles of Umbria, Quattroemme, Perugia 1999.
 Georgina Masson,  Frederick II , Rusconi, Milan 1978.

See also 
 Assisi

Buildings and structures in Assisi
Castles in Umbria